Zigmars Berkolds (born 23 July 1979) is a Latvian luger who has competed from 1996 to 2005. He won the silver medal in the mixed team event at the 2003 FIL World Luge Championships in Sigulda, Latvia.

References
FIL-Luge profile
Hickok sports information on World champions in luge and skeleton.

External links
 

1979 births
Living people
Latvian male lugers